Gopal Krishna Thota is an Indian politician. He was elected to the Lok Sabha, the lower house of the Parliament of India from the Kakinada in Andhra Pradesh as a member of the Telugu Desam Party.

References

External links
Official biographical sketch in Parliament of India website

Lok Sabha members from Andhra Pradesh
Telugu Desam Party politicians
1945 births
2012 deaths
India MPs 1984–1989
India MPs 1996–1997